Charles William Lyon, Jr. (1915-1987) was a sailor from the United States of America, who represented his country in the Snowbird in Los Angeles, United States During race one to three and six to eleven.

Sources
 

1915 births
1987 deaths
American male sailors (sport)
Sailors at the 1932 Summer Olympics – Snowbird
Olympic sailors of the United States
Sportspeople from Los Angeles